The National Union of Leather Workers is the former name of:

 National Union of Leather and Allied Workers, a South African trade union
 National Union of Leather Workers and Allied Trades, a former British trade union